Robert Rubinstein may refer to:

 Robert A. Rubinstein (born 1951), cultural anthropologist
 Robert J. Rubinstein (born 1952), social entrepreneur